HDR, Inc. is an employee-owned design firm, specializing in engineering, architecture, environmental, and construction services. HDR has worked on projects in all 50 U.S. states and in 60 countries, including notable projects such as the Hoover Dam Bypass, Fort Belvoir Community Hospital, and Roslin Institute building. The firm employs over 11,000 professionals and represents hundreds of disciplines in various markets. HDR is the 10th largest employee-owned company in the United States  with revenues of $2.5 billion in 2021.
Engineering News-Record ranked HDR as the 5th largest design firm in the United States in 2022.

History
In 1917, the Henningson Engineering Company started as a civil engineering firm in Omaha, where HDR's headquarters remain today. Willard Richardson and Charles W. "Chuck" Durham joined the firm in 1939 as interns. Circa 1950, Richardson and Durham had purchased shares in the firm, and it became known as Henningson, Durham and Richardson, Inc.

The company's first project was designing a power station for the city of Ogallala, Nebraska. Similar projects followed as the firm built water, sewer, electric, and road systems for cities and towns throughout the Midwestern United States, emerging from frontier status.

In 1983, Bouygues SA, France's largest construction company, purchased HDR for $60 million. An employee group bought back HDR in 1996 for $55 million. The company has since grown from 1,100 employees to over 11,000.

Sustainability
HDR was the first A/E firm to join the U.S. Green Building Council in 1994, and was involved in the development of the first Leadership in Energy and Environmental Design (LEED) Green Building Rating Tool. More recently, the firm received attention for its Sustainable Return on Investment (SROI) process, wherein clients evaluate sustainable strategies today and into the future.

HDR also was one of the first firms involved with the Institute for Sustainable Infrastructure, which aims to do for infrastructure what the U.S. Green Building Council has done for buildings. HDR's project, the William Jack Hernandez Sport Fish Hatchery, was the first to receive an Envision rating from ISI.

In the early 1990s, HDR formally established a Sustainable Solutions Program tasked with integrating sustainability into all business practices. Today, the program includes aspects of the A/E/C industry, climatology, building design, mobility, natural resources, climate change, renewable energy, land-use planning, and economic and environmental modeling.

Acquisitions 
Since the employee buyout in 1996 from the French conglomerate Bouygues, HDR has acquired over 60 firms around the world. In February 2011, HDR acquired Cooper Medical, an Oklahoma City, Oklahoma, based firm providing integrated design and construction services for healthcare facilities throughout the U.S. The new alliance, HDR Cooper Medical, will provide a service design and construction delivery model to healthcare clients. In February 2011, HDR acquired Schiff Associates, a recognized leader in corrosion engineering headquartered in Claremont, California, with offices in Houston, Las Vegas, and San Diego. Schiff is now conducting business as HDR|Schiff.

In January 2011, HDR acquired HydroQual, Inc., which specializes in water resource management. Based in Mahwah, N.J., HydroQual has nine offices in New Jersey, New York, Massachusetts, Florida, Utah and Dubai. HydroQual is now conducting business as HDR|HydroQual. Also in January 2011, HDR acquired Amnis Engineering Ltd., based in Vancouver, British Columbia. The firm provides engineering and consulting services in British Columbia and a number of international locations for hydropower and water resources infrastructure.

In March 2013, HDR acquired TMK Architekten • Ingenieure, a German healthcare architecture firm. The merged company is the hub for HDR's healthcare and science design programs in Europe. HDR has offices in Berlin, Duesseldorf, Munich, and Leipzig, Germany.

In April 2013, HDR acquired Salva Resources, a global provider of technical and commercial services for mining exploration and investment in Brisbane, Australia.

In July 2013, HDR acquired the business and assets of Sharon Greene + Associates, a firm specializing in transportation economics and financial analysis.

In November 2013, HDR acquired Rice Daubney Architects, a firm in Sydney, Australia. The merged company conducts business as HDR Rice Daubney and is the hub for HDR's healthcare, defence, retail, and commercial work in Australia and HDR's retail and commercial work throughout the globe.

In January 2015, HDR acquired the assets of MEI, LLC, a liquid natural gas engineering and consulting firm based in Pooler, Georgia.

In July, 2015, HDR acquired CEI Architecture of Vancouver, British Columbia, an architectural, planning and interior design consultant.

In September, 2017, HDR acquired long-time partner, Maintenance Design Group, a firm specializing in the planning and design of vehicle and fleet operations and maintenance facilities. HDR sought to add MDG's strengths in facility planning and design to complement its asset life-cycle approach to infrastructure development.

In 2018, HDR expanded its water resources services by acquiring the assets of David Ford Consulting Engineers, a firm based in Sacramento, California.  The firm specializes in water hydraulics, flood risk analysis, reservoir systems and operations, water resource planning and hydro-economics.

In May 2019, HDR acquired Calthorpe Associates, an internationally recognized firm in regional planning, urban design and transit-oriented development.

Hurley Palmer Flatt
In July 2019, HDR expanded its footprint in Europe and Asia by acquiring the British firm Hurley Palmer Flatt, as well as its subsidiaries; Hurley Palmer Flatt rebranded to HDR in early 2022.

Hurley Palmer Flatt was a multi-disciplinary engineering consultancy based in London. It provided mechanical and electrical engineering consultancy and associated services. It was established in 1968 in the UK by John Hurley as a building services consultancy. It expanded into a global company operating in Dubai, India, Australia, Singapore and the US, engaging in both public and private sector development across various fields.

In 2009 Hurley Palmer Flatt acquired ATCO Consulting, expanding its reach in Scotland.

In 2014 it acquired London-based mechanical and engineering firm Andrew Reid and Partners (AR&P) and took a majority controlling share of the business. AR&P had been established in 1970 by Andrew Reid. Its core services included diagnostic assessments of under-performing buildings and the management or independent validation of building engineering services commissioning. Its work in commissioning began at the Barbican Arts Centre, through all 14 phases of London's Broadgate development to the present day including the 750,000ft2 headquarters for UBS at 5 Broadgate in London. From the late 1990s, AR&P successfully commissioned data centres for several of the world most successful brands. Its design engineers were involved in work at The National Gallery from the mid 1980s when the company designed the building services for the new Sainsbury Wing, and have been involved in other museums and galleries including Dulwich Picture Gallery, the National Maritime Museum and the Imperial War Museum.

In 2016, Hurley Palmer Flatt acquired a majority share in the civil and structural engineering business, Bradbrook Consulting, which had UK offices in London, Kingston, Watford, and Manchester, and a Dubai office.

In 2016, the company moved its central London office to 240 Blackfriars at the South Bank Tower on a 10-year lease as part of its expansion plan.

Notable Hurley Palmer Flatt projects

 Sea Containers House, UK
 Taymouth Castle, UK
 195-197 Kings Road, UK, for Martins Properties
 Weston Library, Oxford University, UK, shortlisted for the 2016 Stirling Prize.
 Renovated Archive & Book Storage Facility, Bodleian Library, Oxford University, UK
 Aberdeen Exhibition And Conference Centre Energy Centre, UK, for Henry Boot Developments 
 Singapore Changi Airport, Singapore 
 New Data Centre Australian Securities Exchange, Australia
 1 Knightsbridge, for JP Morgan, UK
 Croydon Data Centre, for Morgan Stanley, UK
 Dundee railway station, UK
 10 Upper Bank Street & The Zig Zag Building, Victoria, for Deutsche Bank, UK
 131 Sloane Street, for Marshall Wace, UK

Notable Andrew Reid and Partners projects

The National Gallery       
The Imperial War Museum
National Maritime Museum   
Broadgate development, London 
Deutsche Bank
Mary Rose Trust  
Ashmolean Museum 
University of Greenwich 
Guildhall School of Music

Hurley Palmer Flatt awards and recognition

 Number 34 in Top 150 Consultants 2016 by Building  
 View58 (58 Victoria Embankment) was Highly Commended the 2016 Property Awards in the Sustainability category.
 Nominated for the Training Initiative of the Year at the Consultancy and Engineering Awards 2016.
 Weston Library won AJ100 Building of the Year.  
 Weston Library also won the RIBA National Award 2016, RIBA South Award 2016 and the RIBA South Building of the Year 2016. 
 Winner in the Affordable Housing category at the Scottish Design Awards 2008 for Fyne Homes & CP Architects Gigha project in West Scotland.
 Nominated for the CIBSE Employer of the Year 2017 Award 
Number 24 in Top 150 Consultants 2019 by Building

Controversies

Prison design
HDR Architecture's jail and prison design projects have faced criticism from advocates in communities where the projects are proposed. In 2019, advocates in Travis County, TX opposed the construction of a new women’s jail, arguing the resources would be better spent on programs to address concerns like addiction and mental health. Following community pressure, Travis County commissioners indefinitely paused HDR's $4.6 million contract to design the women's jail in June 2021. HDR also faced criticism from advocates in Massachusetts after being selected in 2021 to design a new women’s prison for the Massachusetts Department of Correction. Advocates opposed all new prison construction and particularly argued against HDR’s proposed “trauma-informed” design, saying it was not possible in a prison environment.

Monitoring of activists
In August 2021, a Motherboard story detailed HDR's monitoring services provided to government agencies conducting controversial projects. The report highlighted HDR's "corporate counterinsurgency" work, especially social media monitoring, to anticipate and disrupt public opposition to projects, including highways built through sacred Indigenous sites and prison and jail construction.

Awards

In 2018, the American Council of Engineers awarded the Grand Conceptor Award to HDR and joint venture partner WSP USA for the design and construction of a new roadway within the steel-arch Bayonne Bridge—64 feet above an existing highway it was to replace. The Grand Conceptor Award signifies the year's most outstanding engineering achievement. The recognition marked HDR's fourth Grand Conceptor in the company's 100-year history, and the second time that HDR received the award two years in a row. In 2017, the State Route 520 floating bridge earned the American Council of Engineering Companies' Grand Conceptor Award.

HDR also won back-to-back Grand Conceptor Awards in 2010 and 2011. The 2011 award winner was the Hoover Dam Bypass. HDR was the project manager for this project. The Hoover Dam Bypass won several other industry awards. The 2010 winner was the Gills Onions Advanced Energy Recovery System in Oxnard, California, which uses onion waste to produce renewable energy.

Select designs

Cleveland Clinic Abu Dhabi, Abu Dhabi, United Arab Emirates
Hoover Dam Bypass, Arizona-Nevada
Walter Cronkite School of Journalism and Mass Communication building at Arizona State University, Tempe, Arizona
Historic Fourth Ward Park, Atlanta, Georgia
Holland Performing Arts Center, Omaha, Nebraska
Johnnie B. Byrd Sr. Alzheimer's Center & Research Institute, Tampa, Florida
San Antonio River Walk, San Antonio, Texas
The new Parkland Memorial Hospital, Dallas, Texas
Bill Young Reservoir, Tampa, Florida
Bridgepoint Health, Toronto, Ontario
Fort Belvoir Community Hospital, Fort Belvoir, Virginia
Tappan Zee Bridge Replacement, New York City
Baxter Arena, Omaha, Nebraska
Humber River Hospital, Toronto, Ontario

References

Design companies established in 1917
Architecture firms based in Nebraska
Construction and civil engineering companies of the United States
Engineering consulting firms of the United States
International engineering consulting firms
Companies based in Omaha, Nebraska
1917 establishments in Nebraska
Construction and civil engineering companies established in 1917
Business services companies established in 1917